Strange Clouds is the second studio album by American rapper B.o.B, released on May 1, 2012, under Grand Hustle Records, Rebel Rock Entertainment, and Atlantic Records. The album features guest appearances from Morgan Freeman, Taylor Swift, Lil Wayne, Chris Brown, T.I., Nicki Minaj, Ryan Tedder, Lauriana Mae, Playboy Tre, Trey Songz, Nelly and Roscoe Dash while the production was handled by Dr. Luke, Cirkut, Ryan Tedder, Lil' C, Mynority, Stargate, Frequency, Mike WiLL Made It, P-Nasty, Super Water Sympathy, Kutta, Billboard, Jamieson Jones, Jim Jonsin and B.o.B himself.

Background
B.o.B first spoke of the album, back in May 2011 in an interview with MTV. "I would have to parallel my album coming out to my first one," he told MTV at the South by Southwest music festival. "The first time you record an album is way more exciting than the second time. Not that the second time isn't exciting, it's just ... the initial excitement of finally having that first album." During the interview he stated: "I think that people will definitely be surprised at the music they hear on the second album, I don't think they would expect that coming from me." On June 9, 2011, B.o.B confirmed he was working on the follow-up album to his debut, B.o.B Presents: The Adventures of Bobby Ray (2010). In a statement given to Detroit's MLive.com, Bobby Ray said: "I’m really excited about this one. You’re always excited about every project. But I really feel like I’m in my groove with this one. I’m more aware of myself as an instrument, as a sound. It's more intentful." As the Atlanta rapper continued, he spoke on his process of making songs as if he was performing the song live: "I make music just to perform it. A lot of the thought process (of working on an album) goes into actually performing it."

On September 27, 2011, B.o.B appeared on an online video stream on Atlanta's V-103 WVEE radio station, to promote the lead single "Strange Clouds". While there he announced the title of the album to also be Strange Clouds and revealed the album was to be released in early Spring of 2012. Bobby Ray held the first listening session for the album at Tree Sound Studios on October 25, 2011. Seven new songs were previewed during the listening session, including his single "Play the Guitar" which features André 3000. Other guest appearances confirmed, as the album was not fully complete, include Lil Wayne, Big K.R.I.T., Nelly and a song with T.I. titled "Arena". In addition he has worked with OneRepublic on a song and has been quoted as having: "the song of 2012 with a mega feature from somebody who never does features with anyone!".  On November 15, 2011, B.o.B revealed he would be releasing a mixtape titled E.P.I.C. (Every Play Is Crucial) prior to the album's release. The mixtape was released on November 28, 2011, featuring guest appearances from Eminem, Mos Def, Roscoe Dash, Meek Mill, and Bun B amongst others and included production from Ryan Tedder to Lil' C and Jim Jonsin. Two songs off the mixtape, "What Are We Doing" and "Guest List", both appear on the Deluxe Edition as bonus tracks, respectively. The album was originally set to be released on March 13, 2012, however on February 9, B.o.B announced the album had been pushed back, and the new release date was May 1, 2012. On February 21, 2012, the official second single, "So Good", was released to radio and digital download.

B.o.B explained the album title comes from a concept of his: "Strange Clouds is kind of a science-fictiony kind of title, mixed with recreational activities. It's really like a fusion between the hip-hop lifestyle and the people whose thoughts cross into the other realm of thinking, outside of the norm, which may be considered strange or weird, or unique. And, I feel like it's all about hybridizing these two different worlds — on the ground level to the skies. If that makes sense." B.o.B previously promised fans a "different sound" compared to his debut: "I feel like the sound is a continuum from the last album, just more mature, more refined, more conversational at moments. You know, I really bring people closer to who I am, and what makes me think, and … my story, growing up as a kid and just letting people know who I am really. I don’t think people really know enough of who I am. You know, I had a really good year last year, and it happened really fast … I needed to sit down for year. I recorded my album — I spent about 13-14 months on it. I’m ready to really build the connection with my fans."

Composition

Recording and production
Strange Clouds features B.o.B working with his usual collaborators such as Jim Jonsin and Dr. Luke, the latter of whom produced hit singles "Magic" and "Strange Clouds". In an interview with Rap-Up, Jim Jonsin spoke of his Rebel Rock artist's upcoming album: "We cut four songs and there's two that I really like. One record has like a reggae vibe to it, hip-hop with some reggae. It's pretty big. I think that's a possible single. He's kinda figuring out the direction and I’m hoping to close out with him to do another three or four songs before the album's done", Jonsin told Rap-Up. While his debut may have been jam-packed with features, Jonsin didn't expect too many guests this time around: "I don’t think he's doing as many features. I think most of his singles will be him and he just wants the fans to hear a lot more of him on this album. It's gonna be incredible."

Mack of Sound-Savvy inquired about how he approached this album differently from his previous projects to which B.o.B responded: "I feel like I had to combine the way I approached a mixtape AND an album. With The Adventures of Bobby Ray, it was a very condensed version with only 11-12 tracks. I wanted to be able to show people who fell in love with the album and the people who fell in love with the mixtapes, from Cloud 9 to The Adventures of Bobby Ray, I wanted to make music for those fans." That said, he stressed the importance of  remaining true to himself and always use his voice and candor to present his ideas and deliver a message. "My dad always says "Now you wanna show people you know music, but pretty soon you’re gonna wanna show people that you know people. And I feel like this album is more on that tip but it still has even better and more mature musicality."

B.o.B told Rap-Up, that for this album he was taking a more hands-on and honest approach: "I feel like this album is the culmination of my life story. I’m bringing people into my world with just the story and the building blocks that created B.o.B, and I wanted to spend a lot of time with it. It's a lot more centered with a core sound. I was a lot more honest on this album. I feel like I’m continuously honest in the moment to moment, but I’m constantly changing." In the same interview B.o.B claims he did about "60 percent of the production": "When I made this album, I wanted to make sure that I was a part of everything that was made, even from the time a demo was recorded to the time it's mixed," he explained. "I really wanted to be hands-on with the project. You really got to treat it like a child. You gotta nurture it and give it the right amount of attention."

Songs and lyrics
At the October 25th listening session at Tree Sound Studios, B.o.B played 8 songs from the album for a private audience, then sat down with Mack of Sound-Savvy to talk about the new album. One of the tracks premiered was "Play the Guitar", B.o.B's ode to his instrument of choice. He describes the song as one that expresses his "love for music and love for the guitar". The song features André 3000 (who is notorious for his frequent guest appearances). Of the song, B.o.B says: "I feel like it shows people that we are two different artists and we actually do sound different and have our own styles. Not to say that I wasn’t influenced by Outkast and André, but I feel like it's a ‘pass-the-torch’ type of moment. He really gave me a lot of love on the feature and I'm looking forward to hearing what people have to say about it." The hook for "Play the Guitar" features a sample of T.I.'s verse from Drake's ‘Fancy’. B.o.B. introduced this one with his origins on playing the guitar, which he picked up after urges from his brother. The song, however was left off the album due to its lackluster performance on the charts.

B.o.B also played an incomplete version of "5 on the Kush", that hadn't been mixed or mastered. This track features Big K.R.I.T. and one other undisclosed rapper whose verse wasn't heard. B.o.B described this as a "Good Southern hip hop song…". Mack of Sound-Savvy wrote "It had a very old school sounding, slow beat with a southern thump to it. This one's a banger for the car." The undisclosed rapper was later revealed to be Bun B, once one half of the southern hip hop duo UGK. The song, produced by 2 Much, was released on B.o.B's eighth mixtape, E.P.I.C (Every Play Is Crucial). Mack of Sound-Savvy called "Arenas" featuring T.I. "a real stadium sounding record, inspired by his live performances and his penchant for interacting with his fans in concert." B.o.B said he wanted to make "something for the fans to sing along to at the shows" and Mack agreed saying: "Sure enough, towards the end of the song, one glance around the room told me that his plan had worked: a large part of the audience was mouthing the hook. Catchy and not too complicated."

A song titled "So Hard to Breathe" was played at the listening session, where B.o.B called it a "sibling or sequel to ‘Don't Let Me Fall’". B.o.B produced this one, and wrote the hook along with Sean Garrett. Mack of Sound-Savvy stated "it opened with a solemn acoustic guitar intro and progresses into a soaring electric guitar backing. Lyrically, it has a tone that's both introspective and retrospective of his career thus far and his life before stardom. He informed us that this song is a favorite of both he and his team. I can definitely hear why." In an interview with PopCrush B.o.B claimed his favorite track on the album to be "So Hard to Breathe": "My favorite track on the album is … it's called ‘Hard to Breathe.’ It may have a different name. I'm not sure what I want to call it yet. But now I guess it's [going to be called] ‘Hard to Breathe.’ I could call it ‘Asphyxiation,’ but then it wouldn't be [something] very good." He went on to say: "It would kind of be the answer to ‘Don’t Let Me Fall’". "So Hard to Breathe" was released as the second promotional single on April 17, 2012.

Before playing "MJ", his collab with St. Louis native Nelly, B.o.B reminded the audience that he's "always been the type of artist to say how I feel" and that the album "really shows all sides of me." The song led to him coining his new term for ballin', "MJ-ing": "[The song] is about ballin'. It's like, I feel like ballin’ has grown into a universal term. You know, anybody can say it. You know, a 5-year-old kid enlisted in minor league sports can say, ‘I’m ballin’.’ The CEO of a business down the street getting off of work, making choices in business left and right, getting into his car, he can say, ‘I’m ballin’.’ A college student could crush up the final exam, end up with a 4.0 [GPA], graduate summa cum laude, they could say, ‘I’m ballin’.’ And that's what it's about. It's about ‘MJ’-ing." The song is included in the Target Deluxe Edition as a bonus track.

Ryan Tedder worked with B.o.B on "So Good", which the rapper describes as a "victory lap song with a big sound that a lot of people will gravitate towards". Mack of Sound-Savvy noted: "In concept and sonically (probably due to Tedder) it reminds me of OneRepublic's current single "Good Life" but has quite a few differences. Not a rip by any means. I could hear it as a feel-good summer single for the pop stations". "So Good" was supposed to be the final song played at the listening session; however, a request from a female in the audience to hear a "record for the ladies" prompted B.o.B to play "Circles". Mack of Sound-Savvy stated: "It wasn't one of the strongest, but it wasn't a dud either. It garnered high praise and applause from the ladies who eagerly let him know they liked it." Record producer and Rebel Rock label boss Jim Jonsin described one song, tentatively titled "Rule the World" that could possibly appear on the album and may be released as a single: "We cut four songs and there's two that I really like. One record has like a reggae vibe to it, hip-hop with some reggae. It's pretty big. I think that's a possible single."

On January 8, 2012, footage of Waka Flocka Flame and B.o.B in the studio recording a song tentatively titled "Fist Pump" was released. It was rumored to be on the album, but B.o.B confirmed on his Twitter account that it will be on Waka Flocka Flame's second effort, Triple F Life: Friends, Fans and Family. On October 8, 2011, American singer-songwriter Taylor Swift brought out B.o.B at her Speak Now World Tour concert at Cowboys Stadium in Dallas, Texas, where they performed "Airplanes". After the performance, speculation of a collaboration between the two began. In March 2012, in an interview with Fuse TV at the SXSW music festival, T.I. confirmed Swift's slot as a featured artist on Strange Clouds. On April 11, 2012, his collaboration with Swift, titled "Both of Us" was leaked.

On March 20, 2012, B.o.B. released the third song from the album, "Where Are You (B.o.B vs. Bobby Ray)". The song is in the same vein as T.I.'s "T.I. vs. T.I.P." from his second studio album Trap Muzik (2003). B.o.B previously touched on the subject of his two alter egos, on his 2009 mixtape B.o.B vs. Bobby Ray. The song's release came just a day after B.o.B's label revealed the cover art for the album.

Release and promotion 
The album was originally set to be released on March 13, 2012, however on February 9, B.o.B announced the album had been pushed back, and the new release date was May 1, 2012. The album art, unveiled March 19, shows Bobby Ray in a chic peacoat holding his temples while standing under a hovering cloud. Then, to drum up even more excitement, Warner Music Group premiered the music video for the hit single "So Good" on March 21. On April 20, snippets from the standard edition of the album surfaced showcasing approximately a minute of each of the 15 songs. On April 26, 2012, the standard album was leaked and on his website, a news post and link came and said "The premiere of Strange Clouds" enabling viewers to listen to the standard edition songs.

Singles 
The lead single and title track, "Strange Clouds" was released on iTunes on September 27, 2011. The song features fellow American rapper Lil Wayne and was produced by Dr. Luke and Cirkut. In the first week of the song's release it sold 197,000 digital copies debuting at number 3 on the US Hot Digital Songs. On the week of October 10, 2011, the song debuted at number 7 on the US Billboard Hot 100 making it the "Hot Shot Debut" of the week. "Strange Clouds" marks his best debut sales week for a single, previously held by the 137,000 launch of "Airplanes" on May 1, 2010. As of February 9, 2013, "Strange Clouds" has been certified platinum by the Recording Industry Association of America (RIAA).

"So Good" served as the album's second single and was released on February 21, 2012, the song features production and additional vocals from Ryan Tedder. The song debuted on the US Billboard Hot 100, on the week of March 10, 2012, at number 11, with 164,000 downloads the first week. The song also reached number 7 on the UK Singles Chart, making it his third top 10 single.

"Both of Us" was the album's third single and received first airplay Top 40 Mainstream radio on May 22, 2012. The song features American singer-songwriter Taylor Swift. It debuted on Australia Top 50 singles chart at number 46. The song sold 143,000 copies first week, along with the album release, debuting at number 18 on the Billboard Hot 100 and became the week's top debut. The song has so far been acclaimed by critics especially  Swift's part with some calling the country-rap collaboration as a sweet and melodious catchy song.

"Out of My Mind" serve as the album's fourth single. The song was confirmed as the next single via Twitter. The song received generally positive reviews by critics, especially Nicki Minaj's verse. The single's music video was shot in July 2012 in Detroit.

Promotional singles
"Play the Guitar", features fellow American rapper André 3000 and was produced by Salaam Remi. The song was intended to be the album's second single, but due to its lackluster performance on the charts, it was used for promotional purposes only. "Where Are You (B.o.B vs. Bobby Ray)" was released as the first promotional single on March 20, 2012. "So Hard to Breathe" was released as the second promotional single on April 17, 2012.

Other songs
"Arena" was serviced to Australian radio in late 2012. It entered the Australian ARIA Singles Chart at #79 on the 17th of December The song peaked at #36 and has been certified Gold by the ARIA for shipments of 35,000 copies.

Critical reception 

Strange Clouds received generally positive reviews from music critics. At Metacritic, which assigns a normalized rating out of 100 to reviews from mainstream critics, the album received an average score of 65, based on 16 reviews, which indicates "generally favorable reviews".

Commercial performance 
In its first week Strange Clouds sold 76,000 copies in the United States, debuted at number 5 on Billboard 200. It also debuted at number 1 on Billboard Top R&B/Hip-Hop Albums and Top Rap Albums. As of November 2013, it has sold 297,000 copies in the United States.

Track listing 

Notes
"Out of My Mind" contains a sample of "Airplanes", as performed by B.o.B and American singer Hayley Williams.
"Back It Up for Bobby" contains a sample of "Supercalifragilisticexpialidocious" by Julie Andrews and Dick Van Dyke.

Personnel 
Credits for Strange Clouds adapted from Allmusic.

Tiffany Almy – legal counsel
Billboard – instrumentation, producer, programming
B.o.B – executive producer, guitar, guitar (acoustic), instrumentation, piano, producer, programming, soloist, vocals
Delbert Bowers – assistant
Mike Caren – A&R
Smith Carlson – engineer
Elliot Carter – engineer
TJ Chapman – management
Ariel Chobaz – engineer
Cirkut – instrumentation, producer, programming
Joseph Cultice – photography
Anne Declemente – A&R
Dr. Luke – instrumentation, producer, programming
Jeremy Dussolliet – composer
Dwayne Carter – composer
Scott Felcher – legal counsel
Nikolaos "Unik" Giannulidis - instrumentation, composer, producer, programming, vocals
John Sabbas - guitar, instrumentation
Ben Didelot - guitar (bass)
Joe Fitz – mixing
Justin Franks – composer
Evan Freifeld – legal counsel
Frequency – engineer, producer
Julie Frost – vocals
Brian "DJ Frequency" Fryzel – composer
Chris Galland – assistant
Sean Garrett – composer
Chris Gehringer – mastering
Serban Ghenea – mixing
Clint Gibbs – assistant, engineer
Lukasz Gottwald – composer, vocals
Alexander Grant – composer
John Hanes – engineer, mixing
Robert Clyde Hargrove – composer
Clifford Harris, Jr. – composer
Stephen Joshua Hill – composer
Bradley Horne – engineer
Ghazi Hourani – assistant
Catherine Ansley Hughes – composer
Jamie Hyder – vocals
Ava James – assistant
Mathieu Jomphe – composer
Jamieson Xavier Jones – composer, instrumentation, producer, programming
Jim Jonsin – executive producer
Megan Joyce – legal counsel

Kato – guitar (bass)
Takehiko Kato – composer
Valentino Khan – composer, producer
Kyle King – composer
Alex Kirzhner – art direction, design
Kool Kojak – vocals
Brent Kutzle – composer, piano
Jose Aguirre Lopez (Mynority)– composer
Ammar Malik – composer, instrumentation, programming
Manny Marroquin – mixing
Ian Mercel – engineer
Corey Miller - engineer
Katie Mitzell – coordination, production coordination
Clarence Montgomery III – composer
Mynority – producer
Doug Peterson – associate producer
Michelle Piza – package manager
Sab-Bion Portloc – vocals
Jasmine Pratt – composer, vocals
Sam Riback – A&R
Brian Richardson – A&R, associate producer, management
Irene Richter – coordination, production coordination
Delarry D.Fi Sanders – composer, drums
Miguel Scott – assistant
Phil Seaford – assistant, assistant engineer, engineer, mixing
Theo Sedlmayr – legal counsel
Jon Sher – assistant
Bobby Ray Simmons Jr. – composer, engineer
Pierre Ramon Slaughter – composer
Tim Sommers – composer
Marsha St. Hubert – marketing
Taylor Swift – vocals, songwriter
T.I. – executive producer
Ryan Tedder – composer, guitar (acoustic), instrumentation, producer, programming, vocals (background)
Ilya Toshinsky – banjo, guitar (acoustic)
Trey Songz – vocals
Henry Walter – composer, vocals
Michael L. Williams II – composer
Noel Zancanella – composer, instrumentation, producer, programming
Cindy Zaplachinski – legal counsel

Charts

Weekly charts

Year-end charts

Certifications and sales

Release history

References

External links
 

2012 albums
B.o.B albums
Concept albums
Atlantic Records albums
Grand Hustle Records albums
Albums produced by B.o.B
Albums produced by Cirkut
Albums produced by Dr. Luke
Albums produced by Jim Jonsin
Albums produced by Ryan Tedder
Albums produced by Mike Will Made It
Albums produced by Lil' C (record producer)